Isola d'Asti is a comune (municipality) in the Province of Asti in the Italian region Piedmont, located about  southeast of Turin and about  south of Asti.

Isola d'Asti borders the following municipalities: Antignano, Asti, Costigliole d'Asti, Mongardino, Montegrosso d'Asti, Revigliasco d'Asti, and Vigliano d'Asti. The municipal seat is in the frazione of Isola Piano.

People
 Giuseppe Govone (1825–1872), Italian general, patriot and politician.
 Angelo Sodano (1927–2022), cardinal.

References

Cities and towns in Piedmont